McKenzie Ellis (born March 12, 1995), known professionally as Mothica, is an American singer. She grew up in Oklahoma City and began producing music when she was 18 years old. Since 2015, she has produced a dozen albums and singles distributed across several online musical streaming platforms such as on Spotify, SoundCloud and Bandcamp along with numerous collaborations and features with other musicians known by "Nydge," "PUSHER," "Crywolf," and "Icarus Moth." In June 2020, a TikTok video she posted that included her song "VICES" went viral, providing greater notability as a musician and singer.

Early life 
Mothica was born McKenzie Ellis on March 12, 1995. She grew up in Oklahoma City, and experienced depression and self-harm, turning to online communities after finding that expressing her struggles in her hometown was taboo.

On January 29, 2011, Ellis attempted suicide. She has additionally experienced assault and domestic abuse.

While she wrote music as a child, Ellis didn't want to be a musician by profession. She began producing music for public release when she was 18 years old. She attended Harding Fine Arts Academy before receiving a scholarship from Pratt Institute for visual web programming, leading her to move to Brooklyn in 2013. In her first year at Pratt Institute, a classmate introduced her to SoundCloud and lent her a MIDI keyboard; the first song she released, titled "Starchild", was played 100,000 times in 24 hours.

Stage name 
Ellis adopted the name "Mothica" for her music and visual art at age 15 in reference to the tendency of moths to be attracted to light.

Career 

Mothica's first song, "Starchild", was played 100,000 times in 24 hours after she released it on SoundCloud. After learning to produce songs in Ableton, she released an EP titled "Mythic" in 2015. The song “No One” from the EP reached No. 6 on the U.S. Viral Spotify Charts.

Mothica has no record label, publicist, or manager, and describes herself as a self-made musician. In 2020, she began promoting her music on TikTok, later attributing the success of her music career to the app. She has more than 500,000 followers on TikTok where she shares openly about her experiences with depression as well as sobriety and hair loss.

In June 2020, Mothica released a song titled "VICES" which reached No. 2 on the iTunes popular music charts, surpassing "Watermelon Sugar" by Harry Styles. The song also charted on the Billboard charts and received more than 5,000,000 views and almost 1,000,000 likes. In August 2020, she released a 12-song album titled "Blue Hour" which autobiographically discussed her progress toward sobriety; the album also charted. She subsequently released an EP titled "Forever Fifteen" in March 2021. In July 2022, she released her second studio album, "Nocturnal".

In November 2022, Mothica was featured on Scene Queen's song "The Rapture (But it's Pink)".

Musical style 
Mothica's pop music is influenced by rock and emo. Mothica has technically described her earliest songs such as in the Mythic EP as "bummer pop" and dream pop.

Personal life 
Mothica has several tattoos. Her first was a geometric cube tattooed on the back of her neck, motivated at the time by enjoyment of architecture and minimalism. She has a sleeve tattoo on her right arm that includes a flying hawk impaled by an arrow as well as the skull of a ram and a fern leaf. She has a tattoo on her back inspired by the painting Lucretia, and tattoos of her song titles "chaos", "heavy hart", "NOW", and "VICES". She also has a tattoo of three moths around a lamppost.

Mothica moved to Los Angeles in 2019 for her career in music, but moved back into her parents' home in Oklahoma City due to the COVID-19 pandemic. Her mother Debbie Ellis, also known as "Momica," has assisted her with the production of music videos.

Discography

Extended Plays:
Mythic (2015)
Heavy Heart (2017)
Ashes (2018)
Forever Fifteen (2021)

Albums:
Blue Hour (2020)
Nocturnal (2022)

References

External links 

 
 

Living people
Musicians from Oklahoma City
Pop musicians
American TikTokers
1995 births